Hēidì or Hēishén, who is the Běidì (Cantonese: Pak Tai) or Běiyuèdàdì, is a deity in Chinese religion, one of the cosmological "Five Forms of the Highest Deity". He is also identified as Zhuānxū, today frequently worshipped as Xuánwǔ or Zhēnwǔ, and is associated with the essence of water and winter. His animal form is the Black Dragon and his stellar animal is the tortoise-snake. By virtue of his association with the north, he has been identified and revered frequently as a representation of the supreme God of Heaven.

His planet is Mercury. His animal form is the Black Dragon and his stellar animal is the tortoise-snake.

Taoist myths involving the Black Deity
A Taoist title of Heidi is the "Dark (or Mysterious) Heavenly Highest Deity". According to a myth, during the fall of the Shang, the Demon King ravaged the world, so that Yuanshi Tianzun ordered the Jade Emperor to appoint Heidi as the commander of twelve heavenly legions to fight this evil. Heidi defeated the Demon King and was subsequently granted the title of Mysterious Heavenly Highest Deity. In temples dedicated to him, the bronze tortoise and serpent under the feet of his image signify that the good always prevails over evil.

Festivals
 The day for celebration of Heidi across China is his birthday, on lunar April 21.
 A festival is held on the island of Taipa in Macau. The celebration at the Pak Tai Temple includes an opera-styled performance
 Annual Bun Festival in Cheung Chau Island, Hong Kong, held in front of the Pak Tai Temple.

Temples in Hong Kong
In Hong Kong, it is worshipped among other places in:

See also
 Xuántiān Shàngdì
 Chinese mythology
 Bok Kai Temple (California, USA)

References

Sources

External links

Chinese gods
Mercurian deities
Wufang Shangdi